Jeong Mi-yeong (born 1 March 1967) is a South Korean politician serving as the Mayor of Geumjeong District of Busan and its first woman mayor from July 2018.

Jeong, along with Busanjin District Mayor Seo Eunsuk and Buk District Mayor Jeong Myeong-hui, was elected as the first woman mayor of their respective district in Busan in the 2018 election where 13 out of 16 autonomous districts/counties of Busan, including Geumjeong District, have their first mayors not from People Power Party or its preceding parties.

In the 2018 election, Jeong defeated two-term mayor of the district, Won Jeong-hee from the main opposition party. She previously served as the member of Geumjeong District Council for three terms, the maximum limit, from 2006 to 2018. From 2008 to 2010 she was elected-vice chair of the council. She is the only democratic politician in Busan who has been elected for the same post for three times and was the only democratic politician elected in the 2006 election in greater Yeongnam region.

She taught Japanese at community centers in Geumjeong district for over 19 years and ran "small-library" for 15 years.

Jeong holds a bachelor's degree in library studies from Pusan National University.

Electoral history

References 

Living people
1967 births
Mayors of places in South Korea
Pusan National University alumni
Geumjeong District
People from Busan
Minjoo Party of Korea politicians
21st-century South Korean women politicians
21st-century South Korean politicians